The Minnesota Judicial Center, adjacent to the State Capitol, houses the state's Supreme Court and Court of Appeals, as well as the Workers' Compensation Court of Appeals and the state law library. Its address is 25 Rev. Dr. Martin Luther King, Jr., Blvd., Saint Paul, Minnesota.

It is listed on the National Register of Historic Places as the Minnesota Historical Society Building, as it was built for that institution. In 1992, the society moved to a new building nearby, the Minnesota History Center.

The neoclassical front of the building has eight two-story Ionic columns of granite. Above them are Roman numerals representing the establishment of the Minnesota Historical Society in 1849 and the year the building was completed, 1917. It was dedicated on May 11, 1918, the sixtieth anniversary of statehood.

See also

National Register of Historic Places listings in Ramsey County, Minnesota

References

Buildings and structures completed in 1917
National Register of Historic Places in Saint Paul, Minnesota
Minnesota state courts
Neoclassical architecture in Minnesota